Parliamentary elections were held in Norway on 11 and 12 September 1977. The Labour Party remained the largest party in the Storting, winning 76 of the 155 seats.

Results

Seat distribution

Notes

References

1977
1977
Norway
1977 in Norway
September 1977 events in Europe